JS Global Lifestyle Co., Ltd. is a Chinese manufacturer of small appliances based in Hangzhou. Joyoung founder Wang Yuning formed JS Global as a holding company in October 2017 after he acquired US-based SharkNinja. The company began trading on the Hong Kong Stock Exchange on 19 December 2019.

References 

Chinese companies established in 2017
Manufacturing companies established in 2017
Home appliance manufacturers of China
Companies based in Hangzhou
Companies listed on the Hong Kong Stock Exchange